Luxury You Can Afford is the seventh studio album by Joe Cocker, released in 1978 on Asylum Records, his only release for that label.

Track listing
 "Fun Time" (Allen Toussaint) – 2:39
 "Watching the River Flow" (Bob Dylan) – 3:16
 "Boogie Baby" (Phil Driscoll) – 3:51
 "A Whiter Shade of Pale" (Gary Brooker, Keith Reid, Matthew Fisher) – 5:27
 "I Can't Say No" (John Bettis, Daniel Moore) – 2:51
 "Southern Lady" (Phil Driscoll) – 3:16
 "I Know (You Don't Want Me No More)" (Barbara George) – 3:08
 "What You Did to Me Last Night" (Bettye Crutcher) – 3:28
 "Lady Put the Light Out" (Guy Fletcher, Doug Flett) – 4:46
 "Wasted Years" (Phil Driscoll) – 4:49
 "I Heard It Through the Grapevine" (Norman Whitfield, Barrett Strong) – 4:29

Personnel 
 Joe Cocker – lead vocals, harmonica (5)
 Barry Beckett – acoustic piano (1, 4, 7, 11), clavinet (1), Fender Rhodes (3), Minimoog (3, 4), ARP String Ensemble (3, 4), Hammond organ (3)
 Richard Tee – acoustic piano (2, 5, 6, 8, 9), Fender Rhodes (10)
 Allen Toussaint – horn and string arrangements (1, 9), Fender Rhodes (2, 3, 8), Hammond organ (5, 6), clavinet (5)
 Randy McCormick – Fender Rhodes (4, 7), clavinet (11)
 Billy Preston – Hammond organ (4, 11)
 Dr. John – Fender Rhodes (6), Hammond organ (8)
 Donny Hathaway – Fender Rhodes (8), acoustic piano (10)
 Mitch Chakour – guitar (1), acoustic  piano (3)
 Cliff Goodwin – guitar (1, 3)
 Pete Carr – lead guitar (2, 11), slide guitar (2), guitar (3)
 Cornell Dupree – guitar (2, 5, 6, 8-10)
 Larry Byrom – lead guitar (4, 7)
 Jimmy Johnson – rhythm guitar (4, 7, 11)
 Joey Murcia – guitar (5, 10)
 George Terry – guitar (5)
 Howie Hersh – bass (1, 3)
 Chuck Rainey – bass (2, 5, 6, 8-10)
 David Hood – bass (4, 7)
 Rick Danko – bass (11)
 John Riley – drums (1, 3)
 Steve Gadd – drums (2, 5, 8-10)
 Roger Hawkins – drums (4, 7, 11)
 Bernard Purdie – drums (6, 8)
 Hank Crawford – alto saxophone (1, 8)
 Leroy Cooper – baritone saxophone (1, 8)
 Ronald Eades – baritone saxophone (2, 5, 7, 8, 11)
 Gary Brown – tenor sax solo (1)
 David "Fathead" Newman – tenor saxophone (1, 9)
 Harvey Thompson – tenor sax solo (2, 9), tenor saxophone (5, 7, 8, 11)
 Bobby Keys – tenor sax solo (3)
 Charles Rose – trombone (2, 5, 7, 8, 11)
 Marcus Belgrave – trumpet (1, 9)
 Phillip Guilbeau – trumpet (1, 9)
 Harrison Calloway, Jr. – trumpet (2, 5, 7, 8, 11), horn arrangements (2, 5, 7, 8, 11)
 Wayne Jackson – trumpet (2, 5, 7, 8, 11)
 Clyde Kerr Jr. – trumpet solo (7)
 Clydie King – backing vocals
 Ann Lang – backing vocals
 Mona Lisa Young – backing vocals

Production 
 Producers – Barry Beckett and Allen Toussaint
 Executive Producer – Michael Lang 
 Engineers – Bill Gazecki, Skip Godwin, Gregg Hamm, Jerry Masters, Steve Melton and Alex Sadkin.
 Assistant Engineers – Bob Gore, Roberta Grace, Sheila Taylor and David Yates.
 Recorded at Criteria Studios (Miami, Florida); Sea-Saint Studios (New Orleans, Louisiana); Muscle Shoals Sound Studios (Sheffield, Alabama); Elektra Sound Recorders (Los Angeles, CA).
 Mixing on Tracks 2, 5, 6, 7 & 10 – Barry Beckett
 Mastered by Terry Dunavan 
 Mixed and Mastered at Elektra Sound Recorders.
 Design – Johnny Lee
 Photography – Gary Heery

Chart performance

References

1978 albums
Joe Cocker albums
Albums produced by Allen Toussaint
Asylum Records albums
Albums recorded at Muscle Shoals Sound Studio
Albums recorded at Sea-Saint Studios